Sleepwave is a rock band based out of St. Petersburg, Florida. It was founded in 2013 by vocalist Spencer Chamberlain after the dissolution of Underoath. Chamberlain brought in longtime friend Stephen Bowman, and the band signed with Epitaph Records. Shortly after, the duo announced their debut album, Broken Compass. Their song, "Through the Looking Glass", peaked at number 37 on the Billboard Mainstream Rock chart following its release in July 2014.

History
Underoath announced their plans to disband during the fall of 2012. Chamberlain said of the disbanding, "It's sad to say that we feel like it's time to close this chapter, but we have never seen things more clearly. These have been the best years of my entire life, and I owe that to every single person who ever supported this band along the way. This wasn't a quick decision by any means. It's just time for us to move on." Underoath played their last show in 2013, and shortly after Chamberlain announced his intentions to start work on a new band, Sleepwave. They released their debut single "Rock and Roll is Dead and So Am I" in October of that same year.

The band's first tour came in early 2014, with Tonight Alive as a supporting for Taking Back Sunday and The Used. They announced their signing to Epitaph Records in July. Following this, the band released several new songs off their debut album, "Through the Looking Glass" and "The Wolf", as well as corresponding music videos. The dates for their first headlining tour in August and September.

Their debut effort, Broken Compass, was released on September 16, 2014. It reached number 4 on the Top Heatseekers chart in the U.S. It has been met with generally positive reviews. The overall album has "retained the muscularity of Chamberlain's former band while introducing ambient and industrial textures into the mix, resulting in a melodic and accessible sound that leans harder toward the modern hard rock spectrum." "Through the Looking Glass" charted at number 37 on the Mainstream Rock Songs chart.

Sleepwave planned on touring through 2015 in support of Broken Compass. In late 2015 they also opened for a reunited Armor for Sleep, who were touring to celebrate the 10th anniversary of their 2005 album, What to Do When You Are Dead.

Discography
 Broken Compass (2014)

Band members

Current
 Spencer Chamberlain – vocals, guitars, bass guitar, keyboards, programming (2013–present)
 Stephen Bowman – guitars, bass guitar, keyboards, programming (2013–present)

Touring musicians
 Jesse Shelley – drums, percussion (2014–present)
 Jack Burns – guitar, keyboards (2014–present) formerly of Oceana
 Joshua McLin – bass (2014–2015)
 Casey Jago – bass (2015–present)

References

Metalcore musical groups from Florida
Musical groups established in 2013
2013 establishments in Florida